Yasmani Romero (born 26 September 1988, Las Tunas) is a Cuban weightlifter. He competed at the 2012 Summer Olympics in the Men's 56 kg, finishing 11th with a total of 258 kg.

References

1988 births
Living people
Olympic weightlifters of Cuba
Cuban male weightlifters
Weightlifters at the 2012 Summer Olympics

People from Las Tunas (city)
20th-century Cuban people
21st-century Cuban people